Alois Mráz (born 8 September 1978) is a former Czech handball player for TV Hüttenberg and the Czech national team. From 2008 he is a handball coach as well.

References

1978 births
Living people
Czech male handball players
Czech handball coaches
Sportspeople from Plzeň